Paul F. Thomas (born November 21, 1963) is a United States Coast Guard vice admiral who serves as Deputy Commandant for Mission Support since June 22, 2021. He previously served as Deputy for Personnel Readiness to the Deputy Commandant for Mission Support from July 2019 to June 2021, with tours as commander of the Eighth Coast Guard District from August 2017 to July 2019 and commander of Coast Guard Sector Jacksonville from July 2006 to August 2009.

Thomas graduated from the United States Coast Guard Academy in 1985 with a B.S. degree in naval architecture and marine engineering. He later earned separate M.S. degrees in naval architecture and marine engineering from the Massachusetts Institute of Technology.

References

Living people
1963 births
People from Schenectady, New York
Military personnel from New York (state)
United States Coast Guard Academy alumni
Massachusetts Institute of Technology alumni
Recipients of the Coast Guard Distinguished Service Medal
Recipients of the Legion of Merit
United States Coast Guard admirals